Dianthus pendulus is a herbaceous perennial plant belonging to the family Caryophyllaceae.

Description
It is a subshrub with the buds close to the soil surface. The plant is perennial and has non-succulent smooth, entire, dull green leaves. Its pink flowers are hermaphrodite and bloom from June to November.

Distribution and habitat
Dianthus pendulus is endemic to the eastern Mediterranean, it grows on rocky outcrops in Lebanon, Syria and northern Israel and Iraq.

References

pendulus
Flora of Lebanon
Flora of Israel
Flora of Palestine (region)
Taxa named by Pierre Edmond Boissier